Struthio kakesiensis is an extinct oospecies of ratite bird known from eggshell fossils found in Laetoli, Tanzania. It was related to the modern day Struthio.

References

kakesiensis
Egg fossils